In the post-World War II era, the technique of narcosynthesis (as it was later called) was developed by psychiatrists as a means of treating patients who suffered from posttraumatic stress disorder. Narcosynthesis—also called sodium amytal interview, amobarbital interview, or amytal interview—uses a technique of free association as well as dream and transference material during the session as a basis for uncovering relevant topics for later therapeutic discussion.

History
Narcosynthesis (via sodium amytal and pentothal) procedures in the United States are extraordinarily rare today.  However, they were widely used in the post-World War II era when only a very few psychiatric treatments were even available.  Administered as an inpatient hospital admission and overseen by anesthesiologist—this procedure is only used in the most extreme cases in the United States.  

Information from outside of the US shows that, in countries such as India, Narcosynthesis has been used for the interrogation of possible suspects in criminal cases.  There has also been some use of barbiturate hypnosis therapy in the past.

Accuracy
The accuracy of the therapy's results is debated. As in frank hypnosis, repressed unconscious thought may be more likely to come forth rather than consciously suppressed evidence. Yet there is a deficiency of the ego mechanism; therefore, the true manner for determining truth would most likely be carried out by uncovering conflicting responses through multiple questionings.

Criticisms
Opponents of narcosynthesis argue that there is little scientific evidence to warrant its use as a reliable source of interrogation, citing misuses by the CIA and several Indian police agencies. The CIA is said to be responsible for at least one death due to the administration of LSD as a truth serum. India is referred to as the narcoanalysis capital of the world with so-called biscuit teams (behavioral science consultation teams) using pseudoscience to back illegal interrogations. Though security agencies worldwide have shown interest, inconsistent results have proven objective truth elusive, despite increased suggestibility.

Advantages
In 1930, Dr. William Bleckwenn introduced narcoanalysis as a therapy for severely schizophrenic patients or those who suffered from catatonic mutism. These people after being administered the drug would be released from their somatic state for short periods. They could carry on conversations, partake in meals, and behave as if completely healthy; however, the effect was temporary. After some hours, they returned to their prior condition. Despite these short-lived effects, the treatment was common practice in English asylums through the '40s and '50s.

It was from this treatment that cathartic abreaction came into use as a treatment for soldiers following the Second World War. The administration of short-term barbiturates caused disinhibition which facilitated the soldiers' participation in psychotherapy. Therapists worked with the soldiers to recall battle traumas, and subsequently attempt to treat or reduce the effects of "shell shock" and other manifestations of psychological trauma associated with battle. By augmenting standard hypnosis with narcotics and "synthesizing" mental states through the power of hypnotic suggestion, a negative mental state could be replaced by a positive one.

The efficacy of such techniques remains a source of debate among medical professionals; however, it is the ethical aspect of this area of psychology which provides the greatest challenge to society, as the malleability of the human psyche is well documented throughout history.

See also
 Psychedelic therapy
 Truth serum
 William Bleckwenn
 William Lorenz

References

Hypnosis
Hypnotics